Phebalium nottii, commonly known as pink phebalium, is a species of shrub that is endemic to eastern Australia. It has branchlets with silvery scales, oblong to elliptical leaves, deep pink to mauve flowers arranged in umbels of up to six, with the stamens distinctively offset to one side of the flower.

Description
The upper surface of the leaves is smooth and glabrous, the lower surface covered with silvery scales. Flowering occurs in spring.

Taxonomy and naming
This species was first formally described and named as Eriostemon nottii by Ferdinand von Mueller in Fragmenta Phytographiae Australiae in 1867. In 1899 Joseph Maiden and Ernst Betche changed the name to Phebalium nottii, publishing the change in the Proceedings of the Linnean Society of New South Wales. The specific epithet honours "Dr. Nott, of Gawler.

Distribution and habitat
Phebalium nottii grows on sandstone in forest and occurs in inland Queensland and in the Grafton and Coonamble-Peak Hill districts in New South Wales.

References

External links
Herbarium specimen at Royal Botanic Gardens Kew

Flora of New South Wales
Flora of Queensland
nottii
Plants described in 1867
Taxa named by Ferdinand von Mueller